The Pinnacle is local high point on the Blue Mountain ridge of the Appalachian Mountains. Due to its location on the Appalachian Trail, and its reputation as one of the best views in Pennsylvania, the Pinnacle is heavily used by hikers.

References

Mountains of Pennsylvania
Landforms of Berks County, Pennsylvania
Tourist attractions in Berks County, Pennsylvania